The Archbishop of Armagh is an archiepiscopal title which takes its name from the city of Armagh in Northern Ireland. Since the Reformation, there have been parallel apostolic successions to the title: one in the Roman Catholic Church and the other in the Church of Ireland. The archbishop of each denomination also holds the title of Primate of All Ireland.

In the Church of Ireland, the archbishop is John McDowell, who is the ecclesiastical head of the Church of Ireland and the diocesan bishop of the Diocese of Armagh. He was elected as archbishop in March 2020 and translated to the role on 28 April 2020.

In the Roman Catholic Church, the archbishop is Eamon Martin, who is the ecclesiastical head of the Roman Catholic Church in Ireland, metropolitan of the Province of Armagh and the ordinary of the Archdiocese of Armagh. He succeeded on 8 September 2014, having been ordained Coadjutor Archbishop of Armagh on 21 April 2013 at St Patrick's Roman Catholic Cathedral, Armagh.

History
In the medieval Irish church, the earliest bishops doubled as abbots, with the bishop becoming the junior of the two positions. From the 8th century, if not earlier, the house of Armagh claimed foundation from Saint Patrick, and the position of comarba Pátraic ("successor of Patrick") was held by the abbot of Armagh until the position of abbot and bishop were merged again in the 12th century, with the creation of the archbishopric of Armagh.

Early abbots and bishops of Armagh

Later abbots and bishops of Armagh

Abbots of Armagh

Bishops of Armagh

Pre-Reformation archbishops

Archbishops during the Reformation

Post-Reformation archbishops

Church of Ireland succession

Roman Catholic succession

See also
Primate of All Ireland
Irish Bishops Conference
Book of Armagh
Bachal Isu

Notes

References

  
 
 
 

 
 
 
Armagh